Samat is a village located in Leylek District of Batken Region, Kyrgyzstan. The village is subordinated to the town of Isfana. Its population was 2,359 in 2021.

References

External links 

 Official website of the town of Isfana 

Villages that are part of Isfana
Populated places in Batken Region